Björn Borg was the defending champion of the singles event at the ABN World Tennis Tournament, but did not participate in this edition. Unseeded Heinz Günthardt won the title after a victory in the final against first-seeded Gene Mayer 6–2, 6–4.

Seeds

Draw

Finals

Upper half

Lower half

References

External links
 ITF tournament edition details

1980 ABN World Tennis Tournament